The Shadow Ministry of John Robertson was the Labor opposition from March 2011 to December 2014, opposing the O'Farrell and Baird coalition governments in the Parliament of New South Wales. Robertson's shadow ministry was initally made up of 15 members of the NSW Labor Party caucus, later expanding to 18 members. The shadow cabinet was made up of 'Spokesman/women' or 'Shadow Ministers' whose jobs are to hold the government of the day to account.

Initial arrangement

Final arrangement

See also
2011 New South Wales state election

References

Robertson